Mark Anthony McGrillis  (October 22, 1872 – May 16, 1935) was a 19th-century Major League Baseball third baseman.  He played for the St. Louis Browns of the National League in 1892.  He went to school at the University of Pennsylvania.

External links
Baseball-Reference page

1872 births
1935 deaths
19th-century baseball players
Major League Baseball third basemen
St. Louis Browns (NL) players
Baseball players from Pennsylvania